Oxandra lanceolata is a species of plant in the Annonaceae family. It occurs naturally in Mexico, Cuba, Jamaica, Haiti, the Dominican Republic and Puerto Rico.

It is an evergreen tree growing up to 15 metres high. Its leaves are 3.5-9.5 cm long, 1.5–4 cm wide and elliptic, lanceolate or oblanceolate in shape, with a rounded base and a sharp tip to the leaf blade. The petiole is bare and grows up to 1–2 mm in length. Its compound fruit are ellipsoidal in shape, reddish-black in colour, 11–13 mm long and 7–9 mm wide. Its wood is used as a raw material, such as from October 1886 onwards for truncheons of the Metropolitan Police.

References

Annonaceae
Endemic flora of Cuba
Endemic flora of Haiti
Endemic flora of Jamaica
Endemic flora of the Dominican Republic
Endemic flora of Puerto Rico